A satellite tournament is either a minor tournament or event on a competitive sporting tour or one of a group of such tournaments that form a series played in the same country or region.

Poker
A satellite tournament in poker is a qualifying event. Winners of these satellites usually win the buy-in fee to a larger, more prestigious tournament like the World Series of Poker Main Event. Although there are some land-based satellite tournaments (usually for very high-stakes tournaments), most of them are online-based. Some sites, like PokerStars, maintain several tiers of satellites. A player can thus start out at one tier (not necessarily the lowest one) and play his way to a higher tier. The entry fee for each tier is always higher than the fee for the tier below it, with the first tier being the cheapest.

Tennis
In professional tennis, satellite circuits were four-week tournaments (five before 1987), typically organised by a country's national tennis association and overseen by the International Tennis Federation. They were played by players who were ranked outside the top few hundred by the Association of Tennis Professionals, with openings for unranked players in the qualifying draw. Total prize money ranged from $25,000 to $75,000 per circuit.  ATP points were awarded on the basis of a player's ranking within the circuit and from 1987 onwards on the basis of the conversion of a player's circuit points into ATP points. Players successful at this level of pro tennis would move on to play ATP Challenger Series or even top-flight ATP Tour events. The men's satellite tournaments were discontinued following the 2006 season as the circuit moved exclusively to one-week Futures tournaments.

Pinball
A satellite tournament in pinball is modeled after those in poker. It is a smaller tournament that leads up to a major pinball championship, where participants have the opportunity to win their entry into the larger tournament. Applying the satellite tournament concept to pinball was first done by Northwest Pinball and Arcade Show in 2013 to promote both the show and the tournaments at the show. Since then, some other major tournaments have begun using the concept.

Tennis tournaments
Poker tournaments
Pinball events